Shabankareh District is in Dashtestan County, Bushehr province, Iran. At the 2006 census, its population was 39,214 in 8,130 households. The following census in 2011 counted 20,022 people in 5,004 households. At the latest census in 2016, the district had 22,348 inhabitants living in 6,294 households.

References 

Districts of Bushehr Province
Populated places in Dashtestan County